Saila Saari (born 1 November 1989) is a Finnish retired ice hockey forward. She represented  in the women's ice hockey tournament at the 2018 Winter Olympics, winning a bronze medal, and at the IIHF Women's World Championships in 2015 and 2016.

Saari played the entirety of her club career in the Naisten Liiga and won the Aurora Borealis Cup with JYP Jyväskylä Naiset in 2016 and with Oulun Kärpät Naiset in 2017 and 2018. She was named to the league's All-Star Team in 2014–15 and 2016–17, and was recognized with the Emma Laaksonen Award as the league's fair-play player in 2012–13 and 2017–18.

References

External links
 
 

1989 births
Living people
Finnish women's ice hockey forwards
People from Alavus
Ice hockey players at the 2018 Winter Olympics
Medalists at the 2018 Winter Olympics
Olympic bronze medalists for Finland
Olympic ice hockey players of Finland
Olympic medalists in ice hockey
JYP Jyväskylä Naiset players
Oulun Kärpät Naiset players
KalPa Naiset players
Jyväskylän Hockey Cats players
Sportspeople from South Ostrobothnia